The following is a list of notable persons who were born, or who have lived a significant part of their lives, in Erie, Pennsylvania.

Art and Literature
 Richard Anuszkiewicz, founder and foremost artist of Op Art movement
 Moses Billings, early American portrait painter
 Marc Brown, children's book author and illustrator, creator of the Arthur book series 
 John Silk Deckard, painter, printmaker, sculptor
 David Greenberger, artist
 Thom Hatch, author and novelist who specializes in the history of the American West, the American Civil War, and the Plains Indian Wars
 Eugene Iverd, illustrator and teacher
 Ron Larson, author of several dozen mathematics textbooks
 Leon Ray Livingston, known as "King of the Hobos"
 Ruth Eleanor Newton, illustrator and designer
 Joseph Plavcan, painter and teacher
 Chuck Rosenthal, author
 Ida M. Tarbell, author, journalist, "muckraker"
 John Totleben, comic book illustrator, known for covers of DC Comics' Swamp Thing
 Michael J. Varhola, author
 Charles Erskine Scott Wood, author and leading civil liberties advocate, best known for "Heavenly Discourse"

Athletics

 Sig Andrusking, professional football player
 Art Baker, professional football player, Buffalo Bills, All-American and NCAA National Championship winner in both football and wrestling, pioneering African-American athlete
 Bruce Baumgartner, heavyweight Olympic wrestler, most decorated American wrestler of all time, member of National Wrestling Hall of Fame
 Lou Bierbauer, 19th-century Major League Baseball player
 Dana Bible, former American football coach
 Fred Biletnikoff, professional football player, Oakland Raiders, Super Bowl MVP, Pro Football Hall of Fame
 James Carr, youngest-ever American Olympic wrestler, member of National Wrestling Hall of Fame
 Nate Carr, Olympic wrestler (bronze medalist in 1988), three-time NCAA champion at Iowa State University, member of National Wrestling Hall of Fame
 Rick Chartraw, professional ice hockey player, Montreal Canadiens
 James Conner, professional football player, Arizona Cardinals
 Clifton Crosby, professional football player, Indianapolis Colts
 Ed Cushman, professional baseball player, Buffalo Bisons, Milwaukee Brewers, Philadelphia Athletics, New York Metropolitans, Pittsburgh Pirates, and Toledo Maumees
 Dell Darling, professional baseball player, Buffalo Bisons, Chicago White Stockings, and St. Louis Browns
 Tim Federowicz, professional baseball player, Los Angeles Dodgers
 Bill Finneran, early professional baseball umpire
 George Flint, professional football player, Buffalo Bills
 Fernando Frye, college football player
 Eric Hicks, professional football player, Kansas City Chiefs
 Essie Hollis, professional basketball player, Detroit Pistons
 Sam Jethroe, Negro leagues and Major League baseball player from 1938 to 1966
 Jovon Johnson, professional football player, Ottawa Redblacks, CFL's Most Outstanding Defensive Player Award
 Caryn Kadavy, figure skater, 1987 World Bronze Medalist, 1988 Olympian
 Eddie Klep, professional baseball player, first white American to play in the Negro leagues
 Jack Laraway, professional football player, Buffalo Bills, Houston Oilers
 Tom Lawless, professional baseball player, St. Louis Cardinals, Toronto Blue Jays, and Montreal Expos
 Bob Learn, Jr., professional bowler, 1999 U.S. Open champion who also rolled the PBA's 10th televised 300 game
 Frank Liebel, professional football defensive back for NFL's New York Giants and Chicago Bears
 Kayla McBride, professional basketball player, San Antonio Stars, first-team All-American, Notre Dame
 Mike McCoy, professional football player, Green Bay Packers, unanimous first-team All-American for Notre Dame and 1969 Heisman Trophy candidate
 Curt Miller, WNBA professional basketball coach
 Mike Morrison, professional baseball player, Cleveland Spiders, Syracuse Stars and Baltimore Orioles
 Peter Nyari, professional baseball and Olympic athlete
 Bob Raudman, professional baseball player
 Bob Sanders, professional football player, Indianapolis Colts
 Brian Stablein, professional football player, Indianapolis Colts and Detroit Lions
 Mark Stepnoski, professional football player, Dallas Cowboys and Houston/Tennessee Oilers
 Woody Thompson, professional football player, Atlanta Falcons
 Blidi Wreh-Wilson, professional football player, Tennessee Titans and Atlanta Falcons

Business and politics

 Henry Alden Clark, U.S. Congressman 
 Edward M. Baker, investment broker
 Judah Colt, pioneer
 Kathy Dahlkemper, U.S. Congresswoman and Erie County Executive
 Samuel A. Davenport, U.S. Congressman
 Daniel Dobbins, builder of the U.S. naval fleet for Battle of Lake Erie
 Thomas Hagen, Chairman of Erie Insurance 
 William Himrod, iron industry pioneer and abolitionist
 Warren Kitzmiller, Vermont state legislator
 Michael Liebel, Jr., Mayor of Erie 1906–1911; Democratic member of the United States House of Representatives from Pennsylvania 1915–1917
 Reinhard Liebel, President of South Erie Iron Works; member of the Board of Fire Commissioners, Common Council and Select Council of Erie
 Harry Markopolos, blew whistle in Madoff securities fraud
 Louis Marx, toy maker and founder of Louis Marx and Company; established first factories in Erie and was a part-time resident
 Norman Morrison, Vietnam protester who self-immolated
 Joseph D. Pistone, aka Donnie Brasco, FBI agent who infiltrated Bonanno crime family
 Adena Miller Rich, suffragist, social worker in Chicago, director of Immigrants' Protective League
 Tom Ridge, Secretary of the U.S. Department of Homeland Security, Governor of Pennsylvania, and U.S. Congressman
 James Patrick Rossiter, lawyer and politician
 William Lawrence Scott, 19th-century politician and wealthy businessman
 Milton Shreve, U.S. Congressman
 Thomas Sill, U.S. Congressman

Film, stage, and television

 Nick Adams, Broadway actor
 Alaska Thunderfuck 5000, drag performer and recording artist
 Billy Blanks, inventor of Taebo and martial arts film actor
 Marc Blucas, actor
 Marilyn Burns, actress, known for role as Sally in 1974 movie The Texas Chain Saw Massacre
 Bob Chitester, public television and documentary film producer, known as "...the man who made Milton Friedman a star..."
 Ann B. Davis, actress, known for role as Alice on TV's Brady Bunch
 Dorothy Dietrich, magician and escapologist
 Kurt Doss, child actor
 Christine Estabrook, television and film actress
 Ish Kabibble, comedian and actor
 Harry Kellar, magician
 Tina LeBlanc, ballet dancer, teacher and ballet master
 Julianna McCarthy, original cast member of The Young and the Restless
 Dan Rice, 19th century entertainer and clown
 Maria Sansone, television host of Good Day LA
 Steve Scully, host, political editor, and senior producer of C-SPAN's Washington Journal
 Jonathan Stark, actor and screenwriter
 Denman Thompson, playwright and actor
 Kay Williams, actress

Military and aerospace

 John Boyd, fighter pilot and military strategist who developed the OODA Loop and helped with the success of the Persian Gulf War
 Paul K. Carlton, general United States Air Force; commander in chief of the Military Airlift Command
 Philip Cochran, colonel United States Army Air Corps; commander of the 1st Air Commando Group in World War II; inspiration for the characters of "Flip Corkin" and "General Philerie" in comic strips by Milton Caniff
 Charles A. Curtze, rear admiral United States Navy
 Richard E. Ellsworth, U.S. Air Force Brigadier General
 Charles Vernon Gridley, U.S. Navy Commander, Captain, U.S.S. Olympia, Battle of Manila Bay; adopted Erie as his home after taking command of the USS Michigan there
 Louis J. Magill, Spanish–American War veteran; recipient of the Marine Corps Brevet Medal
 Seth Reed, Lt. Colonel, fought at Bunker Hill; instrumental in adding "E Pluribus Unum" to U.S. coins; founded Erie, as its first settler with his family, in 1795, at Presque Isle
 Strong Vincent, Union brigadier general; killed at Gettysburg; Harvard graduate; practiced law in Erie from Waterford, Erie County
 Anthony Wayne, American Revolutionary War general
 Paul J. Weitz, U.S. Naval aviator; NASA astronaut; Skylab 2 pilot; STS-6 (Shuttle Challenger) Commander
 William Maxwell Wood, first Surgeon General of the US Navy

Music

 Alan Baer, tuba, New York Philharmonic
 Harry Burleigh, classical music composer
 Walter Hendl, conductor, composer and pianist
 Peter Mennin, composer and teacher
 Patrick Monahan, lead singer of Train; solo artist; Grammy Award winner
 Chris Vrenna, drummer of rock band Nine Inch Nails
 Jack Stauber, Solo Musician and Songwriter

Naturalists

 Joe Root, 19th-century naturalist who lived at Presque Isle State Park

Religion

 Joan Chittister, Benedictine nun, author, and lecturer
 Max C. Currick, Reform rabbi
 John Mark Gannon, Catholic archbishop
 Theodore Jurewicz, Russian Orthodox priest and Byzantine iconographer

Science, medicine, and academia

 Richard Beals, Yale professor and author of several mathematical textbooks
 David Dausey, professor, author and epidemiologist 
 Millicent Goldschmidt, microbiologist, professor emerita at University of Texas
 John Kanzius, inventor; radio and TV engineer and executive
 Tara Keck, professor at University College London, published numerous scholarly articles on neuroplasticity
 Artemas Martin, mathematician, published numerous scholarly articles on diophantine analysis
 Paul Siple, Antarctic explorer who developed the wind chill factor

References

 
Erie, Pennsylvania
Erie